

Superbike race 1 classification

Superbike race 2 classification

Supersport classification

Eurospeedway Lausitz Round
Eurospeedway